Antonio Celli, O.P. (2 October 1595 – 1645) was a Roman Catholic prelate who served as Bishop of Isola (1641–1645).

Biography
Antonio Celli was born in Tolfa, Italy on 2 October 1595 and ordained a priest in the Order of Preachers.
On 16 September 1641, he was appointed during the papacy of Pope Urban VIII as Bishop of Isola.
On 6 October 1641, he was consecrated bishop by Alessandro Cesarini (iuniore), Cardinal-Deacon of Sant'Eustachio, with Giovanni Battista Altieri, Bishop Emeritus of Camerino, and Deodato Scaglia, Bishop of Melfi e Rapolla, serving as co-consecrators. 
He served as Bishop of Isola until his death in 1645. 
While bishop, he was the principal co-consecrator of Marco Antonio Gussio, Bishop of Cefalù (1644).

References

External links and additional sources
 (for Chronology of Bishops) 
 (for Chronology of Bishops)  

17th-century Italian Roman Catholic bishops
Bishops appointed by Pope Urban VIII
1595 births
1645 deaths
Dominican bishops